Herman Johnson may refer to:
 Herman Johnson (American football) (born 1985), American football guard
 Herman A. Johnson (1916–2004), businessman, politician, philanthropist and civic leader in Missouri
 Herman E. Johnson (1909–1975), American country blues guitarist
 Herm Johnson (1953–2016), American racing driver
 H. Johnson (born 1937/38), American radio personality